The 1898 Georgia Bulldogs football team represented the Georgia Bulldogs of the University of Georgia during the 1898 Southern Intercollegiate Athletic Association football season. The Bulldogs competed as a member of the Southern Intercollegiate Athletic Association (SIAA) and compiled a 4–2 record.  The team got off to 4–0 start that included a second straight victory over Georgia Tech, but finished with losses to Auburn and North Carolina. 1898 also marked the first time the Bulldogs beat Vanderbilt in three tries.  This was the team's second and final season under the guidance of head coach Charles McCarthy.

The backfield was led by quarterbacks "Kid" Huff and F. K. McCutcheon, and fullback A. Clarence Jones, one of the south's best punters. Jones was selected All-Southern by W. A. Lambeth of Virginia. Quarterback Huff saved a touchdown in the Vanderbilt game when he tackled the large Wallace Crutchfield.

Schedule

References

Georgia
Georgia Bulldogs football seasons
Georgia Bulldogs football